Hudinja is a Slovene name that may refer to:

Hudinja (district), a district of the City Municipality of Celje and a neighbourhood of Celje
Hudinja (river), a river of Celje
Hudinja, Vitanje, a village in the Municipality of Vitanje, northeastern Slovenia